Tupchi (also Romanized as Tūpchī and Toopchi; also known as Topchi) is a village in Chehregan Rural District, Tasuj District, Shabestar County, East Azerbaijan Province, Iran. At the 2006 census, its population was 402, in 94 families.

References 

Populated places in Shabestar County